Bang Baang – The Sound of Crimes is an Indian Hindi-language murder and suspense drama web series streaming on ZEE5 and ALTBalaji. The lead roles in this web series are played by Mr. Faisu and Ruhi Singh, Ashu Yadav, who are also the internet celebrities of India. It released on 25 January 2021. It is directed by Shraddha Pasi Jairath, produced by Akshay BP Singh of Spacewalkker Films, and co-produced by Dayanand Shetty.

Plot 
A dead body is found in the lands of Udaipur where Inspector Meera is awarded the responsibility to solve the case. The daughter of the Royals of Udaipur goes missing five years ago. The clues found while investigating this dead body makes everyone believe that is the dead body of Princess Ramona. On this corpse, a scarf is found that hints towards Raghu being involved in the murder.

Cast 
 Faisal Shaikh as Raghu
 Ruhi Singh as Meera
 Aman Gandotra as Rohan
 Ratnakar Upadhayay as Vikram
 Gurpreet Bedi as Monisha
 Sharik Khan as vinay, Raghu's friend
 Shreya Gupto as Ramona
 Gargi Sawant as Shimona
 Amit Jairath as Jatin
Prachi Vaishnav as Poonam 
Semal Bhatt as Ajay

Episodes

Reception

Critical Reception 
Kunal Kothari from IndiaForums says that Bang Baang is a juvenile attempt but a whistle-worthy guilty pleasure for everyone or anyone. He also says that the movie has too many twists and turns but it all makes the series very predictable. IndiaForums rated Bang Baang at 1.5/5 stars.

As per Binged team, It has underwhelming climax and juvenile suspense as per the review by binged team. The Binged rating for Bang Baang is 3/10.

References

External links
Bang Baang on IMDb
Bang Baang on ALTBalaji
Bang Baang on ZEE5

Action web series
Indian web series
Hindi-language web series